Mir-Hasan Kazim oglu Vazirov, also spelled Vezirov (February 13, 1889 – September 20, 1918) was an Azerbaijani socialist revolutionary. Vazirov participated in revolutionary movements in the Russian Empire from his youth, for which he was persecuted by the authorities. Later on, he joined the Socialist-Revolutionary Party and became one of the 26 Baku Commissars. He is the great-grandson of Mirza Ali Muhammad Aga, vizier of Ibrahim Khalil Khan of Karabakh Khanate.

Together with his cousin Yusif Vazir Chamanzaminli, they published a satirical magazine in Russian language in Shusha called Trickster. Mir Hasan Vazirov's house in Karabakh was turned into a museum in Azerbaijan SSR.

Biography 
Son of a teacher, he was born in the city of Shusha (then in Russian Empire). During his years in secondary school, he joined the revolutionary movement and became a member of the Socialist-Revolutionary Party. From 1917, he worked with the Bolsheviks and became one of the 26 Baku Commissars of the Soviet Commune which was established in the city of Baku after the October Revolution. He was the People's Commissar of agriculture and from May 1918, Deputy Chairman of the Council of Peasant Deputies of the district of Baku.

On June 18, 1918, he authored a law that confiscated landowners' land and transferred it to the peasants who worked on it.

Death 

When the Commune was toppled by the Centro Caspian Dictatorship, a British-backed coalition of Dashnaks, SRs and Mensheviks, Vazirov and his comrades were captured by British troops and executed by a firing squad between the stations of Pereval and Akhcha-Kuyma of Transcaucasian Railroad.

References
 Ìèð Ãàñàí Êÿçèì îãëû Âåçèðîâ / Mir Gasan Kiazim Vezirov: Áèîãðàôèÿ at www.peoples.ru

1889 births
1918 deaths
Politicians from Shusha
Azerbaijani socialists
Azerbaijani revolutionaries
Azerbaijani atheists
Executed politicians
Left socialist-revolutionaries
Soviet Azerbaijani people
Executed Azerbaijani people
20th-century executions by the United Kingdom
People executed by the British military by firing squad
Articles containing video clips